Hypatopa hecate is a moth in the family Blastobasidae. It is found in Costa Rica.

The length of the forewings is 4.5–6.2 mm. The forewings have pale yellowish-brown scales intermixed with few reddish-brown and brown scales. The hindwings are translucent pale brown, gradually darkening towards the apex.

Etymology
The specific name refers to Hecate, the goddess of magic and enchantment.

References

Moths described in 2013
Hypatopa
Hecate